In the minds of many foreigners, Slovenian folk music means a form of polka that is still popular today, especially among expatriates and their descendants. However, there are many styles of Slovenian folk music beyond polka and waltz.

Prehistory

The Divje Babe flute, an artifact found in a cave near Cerkno, Slovenia, is possibly the oldest known musical instrument ever. Its age is estimated at approximately 55,000 years.

The history of modern Slovenian music can be traced back to the 5th century, when Christianity spread in Carantania. Liturgical hymns (kyrie Eleison) were introduced, and became the first plainchant to make a connection to the peoples' language.

Classical music

Medieval
During the medieval era, secular music was as popular as church music, including wandering minnesingers. Jurij Slatkonja, a Carniolan conductor and composer from Novo Mesto, became the director of the Vienna Boys' Choir in 1498. By the time of Protestant Reformation in the 16th century, music was used to proselytize in Carniola. The first Slovenian hymnal, Eni Psalmi, was published in 1567. This period saw the rise of Renaissance musicians like Jacobus Gallus. Italy was an important musical influence of the period, especially in sacred music, such as that of Antonio Tarsia (composer) of Koper, in oratorio and opera. A Commedia was performed in Ljubljana in 1660, and an opera in 1700 in the family palace of the Auerspergs.

Enlightenment
In 1701, Johann Berthold von Höffer (1667–1718), a nobleman and amateur composer from Ljubljana, founded the Academia Philharmonicorum Labacensis based on Italian models. and the Ljubljana branch of the Roman Academy of Arcadia was founded a few years later in 1709. Apart from Höffer, the Cathedral provost Michael Omerza was also noted for his oratorios. The first major Slovenian opera was performed in 1732, Il Tamerlano by abbate Giuseppe Clemente de Bonomi, maestro di Capella, in the palace of the Carniolan vice-regent, the duke Francesco Antonio Sigifrid Della Torre e Valassina.

Beginning in 1768, German theatre companies arrived and became very popular. The 1794 formation of the Philharmonische Gesellschaft was important because it was one of the first such orchestras in Central Europe.

19th century
The 19th century saw the growth of a distinctively Slovenian classical music sound based on romanticism, while the German minority continued to push for a stronger Germanic identity. The Ljubljana opera house (1892) was shared by Slovene and German opera companies.

Composers of Slovenian Lieder and art songs include Emil Adamič (1877–1936), Fran Gerbič (1840–1917), Alojz Geržinič (1915–2008), Benjamin Ipavec (1829–1908), Davorin Jenko (1835–1914), Anton Lajovic (1878–1960), Kamilo Mašek (1831–1859), Josip Pavčič (1870–1949), Zorko Prelovec (1887–1939), and Lucijan Marija Škerjanc (1900–1973).

20th century
In the early 20th century, impressionism was spreading across Slovenia, which soon produced composers Marij Kogoj and Slavko Osterc.

Avant-garde classical music arose in Slovenia in the 1960s, largely due to the work of Uroš Krek, Dane Škerl, Primož Ramovš and Ivo Petrić, who also conducted the Slavko Osterc Ensemble. Jakob Jež, Darijan Božič, Lojze Lebič and Vinko Globokar have since composed enduring works, especially Globokar's L'Armonia, an opera. In the 1950s, Božidar Kantušer was the most progressive of all, by dint of his atonality.

Contemporary
Contemporary classic music composers include Uroš Rojko, Tomaž Svete, Brina Jež-Brezavšček and Aldo Kumar. Kumar's Sonata z igro 12 (A sonata with a play 12), a set of variations on a rising chromatic scale, is particularly notable.

Opera

The Ljubljana Opera House serves as the national opera and ballet house. Mezzo-soprano Marjana Lipovšek was born in Ljubljana.

Film music

The composer of film scores for 170 films was Bojan Adamič (1912–1995).

Folk music

Vocal
Rural Harmony singing is a deep rooted tradition in Slovenia, and is at least three-part singing (four voices), while in some regions even up to eight-part singing (nine voices). Slovenian folk songs, thus, usually resounds soft and harmonious, and are very seldom in minor.

Instrumental
Typical Slovenian folk music is performed on Styrian harmonica (the oldest type of accordion), fiddle, clarinet, zithers, flute, and by brass bands of alpine type. In eastern Slovenia, fiddle and cimbalon bands are called velike goslarije. Traditional Slovenian music include various kinds of musical instruments such as:
Steirische Harmonika
Kontra
Hammered dulcimer
Cimbalon grande
Drone zither
Violin zither
Zither
Tamburica
Fiddle
Carnian fiddle
Cello
Brunkula cello
Gaida
Brass instruments, such as baritone horn
Clarinet
Jaw harp
Clay pot bass
Okarina
Akelêmb
Klopotec
Panpipes
Wooden cross flutes of various sizes
Psaltery
Tambourine

Folk music revivalists include Volk Volk, Kurja Koža, Marko Banda, Katice, Bogdana Herman, Ljoba Jenče, Vruja, Trinajsto praše, Šavrinske pupe en ragacone, Musicante Istriani, and Tolovaj Mataj.

One of the best Slovenian diatonic accordionists is Nejc Pačnik who won the accordion world-championship twice, in 2009 and 2015.

Slovenian pop-folk music

From 1952 on, the Slavko Avsenik's band began to appear in broadcasts, movies, and concerts all over the West Germany, inventing the original "Oberkrainer" sound that has become the primary vehicle of ethnic musical expression not only in Slovenia, but also in Germany, Austria, Switzerland, and in the Benelux, spawning hundreds of Alpine orchestras in the process. The band produced nearly 1000 original compositions, an integral part of the Slovenian-style polka legacy. Avsenik's most popular instrumental composition is the polka that is titled "Na Golici" (in Slovene), or "Trompetenecho" (in German), and "Trumpet Echoes" (in English). Oberkrainer music, which the Avsenik Ensemble popularized, is always a strong candidate for pop-folk music awards in Slovenia and Austria. Slavko and his brother, Vilko, are usually credited as the pioneers of Slovenian folk music, having solidified its style in the 1950s.

Many musicians followed Avsenik's steps, one of the most famous being Lojze Slak.

Slovenian song festival
A similarly high standing in Slovene culture, like the Sanremo Music Festival has had in Italian culture, was attributed to the coastal Melodies of Sea and Sun and Slovenian song festival, dedicated to a specific genre of popular Slovene music.

Popular music

Contemporary music 

Among pop, rock, industrial, and indie musicians the most popular in Slovenia include Laibach, an early 1980s industrial music group, and most recently the Slovenian pop a cappella band Perpetuum Jazzile.

Pop, rock, metal, and indie music
With more than 15 million views for the official a cappella "Africa" performance video since its publishing on YouTube in May 2009 until September 2013, that earned them kudos from the song's co-writer, David Paich, Perpetuum Jazzile is the group from Slovenia that is internationally most listened online. Other popular bands, most largely unknown outside the country, include Tabu, ManuElla, Društvo Mrtvih Pesnikov (pop-rock), Siddharta, Rok 'n' Band, Pop Design, Fredi Miler, Terrafolk, Leaf Fat (screamo), Amaya, Šank Rock, Big Foot Mama, Yogurt, Dan D, Zablujena generacija, Katalena, Devil Doll (experimental rock), Negligence (band), Chateau, Čuki, Zaklonišče Prepeva, Psycho-Path, Dekadent (black metal), and Buldožer (progressive rock). The deathcore band Within Destruction have released two-full-length albums and have partaken in several European tours; the band is based in Jesenice.

Singer-songwriters
Slovenian post-WWII singer-songwriters include Frane Milčinski (1914–1988), Tomaž Pengov whose 1973 album Odpotovanja is considered to be the first singer-songwriter album in former Yugoslavia, Tomaž Domicelj, Marko Brecelj, Andrej Šifrer, Eva Sršen, Neca Falk, and Jani Kovačič. After 1990, Adi Smolar, Iztok Mlakar, Vita Mavrič, Vlado Kreslin, Zoran Predin, Peter Lovšin, and Magnifico have been popular in Slovenia, as well.

World music
The 1970s Bratko Bibič's band Begnagrad is considered one of the direct influences on modern world music. Bibič's unique accordion style, often solo, with no accompaniment, has also made him a solo star.

Punk rock
Slovenia was the center for punk rock in the Titoist Yugoslavia. The most famous representatives of this genre were Pankrti, Niet, Lublanski Psi, Kuzle, Čao Pičke, Via Ofenziva, Tožibabe, and Otroci Socializma.

Techno and tech-house
Slovenia has also produced two renowned DJs: DJ Umek and Valentino Kanzyani. Specialising in a frantic brand of party techno and tech-house, the pair co-founded the label Recycled Loops as well as having many releases on labels such as Novamute, Primate, Intec and Bassethound Records.

Neue Slowenische Kunst

Neue Slowenische Kunst (a German phrase meaning "New Slovenian Art"), aka NSK, is a controversial political art collective that announced itself in Slovenia in 1984, when Slovenia was part of Yugoslavia.  NSK's name, being German, is compatible with a theme in NSK works: the complicated relationship Slovenes have had with Germans.  The name of NSK's music wing, Laibach, is also the German name of the Slovene capital Ljubljana, creating controversy through evoking memories of the Nazi occupation of Slovenia during the Second World War.

Composition

NSK's best-known member is the musical group Laibach. Other NSK member groups include IRWIN (visual art), Noordung (theater; originally named Scipion Nasice Sisters Theatre, also known as Red Pilot), New Collective Studio (graphics; also known as New Collectivism), Retrovision (film and video), and the Department of Pure and Applied Philosophy (theory). The founding groups of the NSK were Laibach, IRWIN, and Scipion Našice Sisters Theater.

Characteristics
NSK art often draws on symbols drawn from totalitarian or extreme nationalist movements, often reappropriating totalitarian kitsch in a visual style reminiscent of Dada. NSK artists often juxtapose symbols from different (and often incompatible) political ideologies. For example, a 1987 NSK-designed poster caused a scandal by winning a competition for the Yugoslavian Youth Day Celebration. The poster appropriated a painting by Nazi artist Richard Klein, replacing the flag of Nazi Germany with the Yugoslav flag and the German eagle with a dove.

Both IRWIN and Laibach are emphatic about their work being collective rather than individual. Laibach's original songs and arrangements are always credited to the group collectively; the individual artists are not named on their album covers; at one point, there were even two separate Laibach groups touring at the same time, both with members of the original group. Similarly, the IRWIN artists never sign their work individually; instead, they are "signed" with a stamp or certificate indicating approval as a work from the IRWIN collective.

The NSK were the subject of a 1996 documentary film written and directed by Michael Benson, entitled Prerokbe Ognja in Slovenian, or Predictions of Fire in English. Among those interviewed in the film is Slovenian intellectual Slavoj Žižek.

NSK State
Since 1991, NSK has claimed to constitute a state, a claim similar to that of micronations. They issue passports, have presented shows of their work in the guise of an embassy or even as a territory of their supposed state, and maintain consulates in several cities including Umag, Croatia. NSK have also issued postage stamps. Laibach, in 2006, recorded (some may say 'remixed') the NSK State National Anthem on the LP "Volk." The "anthem" adopts its melody from another Laibach song, "The Great Seal." Laibach's version of the NSK anthem includes a computer voice reciting an excerpt from Winston Churchill's famous "We shall fight them on the beaches/We shall never surrender" speech. The computer voice is clearly recognisable as the voice synthesiser Macintalk, built into classic Mac OS, and uses the preset voice Ralph.

The NSK passports are an art project and as such are not valid for travel. However, many desperate people have fallen for a scam in which they are issued a NSK passport. Most of these scams originate in Nigeria and Egypt.

Laibach
Laibach  is a Slovenian avant-garde music group strongly associated with Nazism, martial, and neo-classical musical styles. Laibach formed 1 June 1980 in Trbovlje, Slovenia (then Yugoslavia). Laibach represents the music wing of the Neue Slowenische Kunst (NSK) art collective, of which it was a founding member in 1984.  The name "Laibach" is the German name for Slovenia's capital city, Ljubljana.

See also 
 Drone zither – type of Slovenian zither
 Klopotec – a type of a scarecrow used as a folk instrument
 List of radio stations in Slovenia
 List of Slovenian musicians
 Slovenian rock
 Slovenian-style polka

References
 Burton, Kim. "The Sound of Austro-Slavs". 2000.  In Broughton, Simon and Ellingham, Mark with McConnachie, James and Duane, Orla (Ed.), World Music, Vol. 1: Africa, Europe and the Middle East, pp 277–278. Rough Guides Ltd, Penguin Books. 
 Klemenčič, Ivan, Slovenski godalni kvartet. Ljubljana, Musicological Annual XXIV, 1988.

External links